Zsolt Nyári (born 29 August 1969) is a Hungarian sailor. He competed at the 1988 Summer Olympics, the 1992 Summer Olympics, and the 1996 Summer Olympics.

References

External links
 

1969 births
Living people
Hungarian male sailors (sport)
Olympic sailors of Hungary
Sailors at the 1988 Summer Olympics – 470
Sailors at the 1992 Summer Olympics – 470
Sailors at the 1996 Summer Olympics – 470
Sportspeople from Székesfehérvár